Walter Andrew Brennan (July 25, 1894 – September 21, 1974) was an American actor and singer. He won the Academy Award for Best Supporting Actor for his performances in Come and Get It (1936), Kentucky (1938), and The Westerner (1940), making him one of only three male actors to win three Academy Awards, and the only male or female actor to win three awards in the supporting actor category. Brennan was also nominated for his performance in Sergeant York (1941). Other noteworthy performances were in To Have and Have Not (1944), My Darling Clementine (1946), Red River (1948), and Rio Bravo (1959).

Early life
Brennan was born in Lynn, Massachusetts, less than two miles from his family's home in Swampscott, Massachusetts. His parents were both Irish immigrants. His father was an engineer and inventor, and young Brennan also studied engineering at Rindge Technical High School in Cambridge, Massachusetts.

While working as a bank clerk, he enlisted in the U.S. Army and served as a private with the 101st Field Artillery Regiment in France during World War I. He served in France for two years.  "While there, he suffered an injury to his vocal cords from exposure to mustard gas that left him with his screen trademark: a distinctively reedy, high-pitched voice that became a favorite for celebrity impersonators for decades."

After the war, he worked as a financial reporter for a newspaper in Boston. During the early 1920s, he made a fortune in the real estate market, but lost most of his money during the 1925 real estate slump.

Career

Early work

Finding himself penniless, Brennan began taking parts as an extra in films at Universal Studios in 1925, starting at $7.50 [equivalent to $125.00 in 2022] a day. He wound up working at Universal off and on for the next ten years.

His early appearances included Webs of Steel (1925), Lorraine of the Lions (1925), and The Calgary Stampede (1925), a Hoot Gibson Western. Brennan was also in Watch Your Wife (1926), The Ice Flood (1926), Spangles (1926), The Collegians (1926, a short), Flashing Oars (1926, a short), Sensation Seekers (1927), Tearin' Into Trouble (1927), The Ridin' Rowdy (1927), Alias the Deacon (1927), Blake of Scotland Yard (1927) (a serial), Hot Heels (1927), Painting the Town (1928), and The Ballyhoo Buster (1928). The latter was directed by Richard Thorpe who would use Brennan as an extra several times on films.

Brennan had minor roles in The Racket (1928) from Howard Hughes, The Michigan Kid (1928), Silks and Saddles (1929), The Cohens and the Kellys in Atlantic City (1929), and Smilin' Guns (1929) and The Lariat Kid (1929) with Gibson. He also worked as a stand in.

Brennan was in His Lucky Day (1929), Frank Capra's Flight (1929), One Hysterical Night (1929) (a bigger role), The Last Performance (1929), The Long Long Trail (1929) with Gibson and The Shannons of Broadway (1929).

Other Brennan appearances included Dames Ahoy! (1930), Captain of the Guard (1930), King of Jazz (1930) (Brennan said he played nine parts but when he saw the film "I sneezed and I missed myself"), The Little Accident (1930), Parlez Vous (1930), (a short), See America Thirst (1930) with Harry Langdon and Slim Summerville and Ooh La-La (1930), (another short).

The following year Brennan had more small roles in Hello Russia (1931, a short with Slim Summerville), Many a Slip (1931) with Summerville, Heroes of the Flames (1931) a serial with Tim McCoy, Honeymoon Lane (1931), Dancing Dynamite (1931), Grief Street (1931) directed by Richard Thorpe, and Is There Justice? (1931).

Brennan had a bigger role in Neck and Neck (1931), directed by Richard Thorpe. His parts tended to remain small, however: A House Divided (1931) for director William Wyler, Scratch-As-Catch-Can (1931, a Bobby Clark short directed by Mark Sandrich), and Texas Cyclone (1931, a Tim McCoy Western featuring a young John Wayne).

In 1932 Brennan was in Law and Order (1932) with Walter Huston, The Impatient Maiden (1932) for James Whale, The Airmail Mystery (1932, a serial), and Scandal for Sale (1932). He did another with John Wayne, Two-Fisted Law (1932) though the star was Tim McCoy.

Brennan was in Hello Trouble (1932) with Buck Jones, Speed Madness (1932), Miss Pinkerton (1932) with Joan Bennett, Cornered (1932) with McCoy, The Iceman's Ball (1932, another short for Sandrich), Fighting for Justice (1932) with McCoy, The Fourth Horseman (1932) with Tom Mix, The All American (1932), Once in a Lifetime (1932), Strange Justice (1932), Women Won't Tell (1932) for Richard Thorpe, Afraid to Talk (1932) and Manhattan Tower (1932).

Brennan was in Sensation Hunters (1933) for Charles Vidor, Man of Action (1933) with McCoy, Parachute Jumper (1933), Goldie Gets Along (1933), Girl Missing (1933), Rustlers' Roundup (1933) with Mix, The Cohens and Kellys in Trouble (1933) for director George Stevens, Lucky Dog (1933), and The Big Cage (1933). His scenes in William Wellman's Lilly Turner (1933) were deleted.

Brennan did another serial, The Phantom of the Air (1933), then Strange People (1933) for Thorpe, Meet the Champ (1933, a short), Sing Sinner Sing (1933), One Year Later (1933), Sailors Beware! (1933, a short), Golden Harvest (1933), Ladies Must Love (1933), Saturday's Millions (1933), Curtain at Eight (1933), and My Woman (1933).

James Whale gave him a bit part in The Invisible Man (1933), and he could be seen in King for a Night (1933), Fugitive Lovers (1933), Cross Country Cruise (1934), Beloved (1934), You Can't Buy Everything (1934), Paradise Valley (1934), Radio Dough (1934, a short), The Poor Rich (1934), The Crosby Murder Case (1934), George White's Scandals (1934), Good Girl (1934), Riptide (1934), Uncertain Lady (1934), I'll Tell the World (1934), and Fishing for Trouble (1934, a short).

Brennan was in the Three Stooges short Woman Haters (1934), then did Half a Sinner (1934), The Life of Vergie Winters (1934), Murder on the Runaway Train (1934), Whom the Gods Destroy (1934), Gentlemen of Polish (1934, a short), Death on the Diamond (1934), Great Expectations (1934), Luck of the Game (1934), Tailspin Tommy (1934, a serial), There's Always Tomorrow (1934), and Cheating Cheaters (1934).

Brennan was back with McCoy for The Prescott Kid (1934) and could be seen in The Painted Veil (1934), Biography of a Bachelor Girl (1935), Helldorado (1935), Brick-a-Brac (1935) an Edgar Kennedy short, Northern Frontier (1935), The Mystery of Edwin Drood (1935), and Law Beyond the Range (1935) with McCoy.  He also had a brief uncredited role in Bride of Frankenstein (1935) starring Boris Karloff as Frankenstein's monster.

Around this time Brennan had what he later described as "the luckiest break in the world". He was taking part in a fight scene when an actor kicked him in the face and all his teeth were knocked out. He had to put in false teeth. "I looked all right off the set", he said. "But when necessary I could take 'em outand suddenly look about 40 years older."

Brennan did another Three Stooges short, Restless Knights, and a short called Hunger Pains in (1935).

Work at MGM
A break for Brennan came when he was cast in The Wedding Night (1935), produced by Sam Goldwyn, alongside Gary Cooper (it was actually their second film together). He was only an extra, but his part was expanded during filming and it resulted in Brennan's getting a contract with Goldwyn.

Goldwyn mostly loaned out Brennan's services to other studios. MGM put him in West Point of the Air (1935). He was reunited with Whale in Bride of Frankenstein (1935), in which he had a brief speaking part and also worked as a stuntman.

Brennan's parts remained small in Party Wire (1935), Spring Tonic (1935), The Gay Lady (1935), Man on the Flying Trapeze (1935), and Welcome Home (1935). He did a short, The Perfect Tribute (1935) and was in George Stevens' Alice Adams (1935), but his scenes were deleted.

He could be seen in We're in the Money (1935) and She Couldn't Take It (1935).

Move to Supporting Actor
Brennan finally moved up to significant roles with a decent part in Goldwyn's Barbary Coast (1935), directed by Howard Hawks and an uncredited William Wyler. "That really set me up", he said later.

He followed it with small appearances in Metropolitan (1935) and Seven Keys to Baldpate (1935).

He had one of the leads in Three Godfathers (1936) playing one of the title outlaws.

He had a small role in These Three (1936) with Wyler and a bigger one in Walter Wanger's The Moon's Our Home (1936) and Fury (1936), directed by Fritz Lang.

First Oscar: Come and Get It (1936)
Brennan's breakthrough part came when cast by Howard Hawks as Swan Bostrom in the period film Come and Get It (1936), playing the sidekick of Edward Arnold who eventually marries the girl Arnold abandons (played by Frances Farmer). Producer Sam Goldwyn fired Hawks during filming and replaced him with William Wyler. Brennan's performance earned him the first Academy Award for Best Supporting Actor.

Brennan followed it with support parts in Banjo on My Knee (1936) at Fox, She's Dangerous (1937), and When Love is Young (1937). Goldwyn announced him for a role in The Real Glory in 1936, but he ended up not appearing in the final film.

Brennan had his first lead role in Affairs of Cappy Ricks (1937) at Republic Pictures. He followed it with the co-starring part in Fox's Wild and Woolly (1937), billed second after Jane Withers. He was in The Buccaneer (1938), directed by Cecil B. DeMille.

Brennan portrayed town drunk and accused murderer Muff Potter in The Adventures of Tom Sawyer (1938).

Brennan followed it with The Texans (1938), Mother Carey's Chickens (1938), and Goldwyn's The Cowboy and the Lady (1938) with Gary Cooper – the first time Brennan played Cooper's sidekick.

Second Oscar: Kentucky (1938)
Brennan won his second Best Supporting Oscar for Kentucky (1938), a horse racing film from 20th Century Fox with Loretta Young.

He supported Fred Astaire and Ginger Rogers in The Story of Vernon and Irene Castle (1939). Brennan also appeared in Melody of Youth (1939), and Stanley and Livingstone (1939) at Fox. At MGM he was in Joe and Ethel Turp Call on the President (1939).

Throughout his career, Brennan was frequently called upon to play characters considerably older than he was. The loss of many teeth in the 1932 accident, rapidly thinning hair, thin build, and unusual vocal intonations all made him seem older than he was. He used these features to great effect. In many of his film roles, Brennan wore dentures; in MGM's Northwest Passage (1940) – a film set in the late 18th century – he wore a dental prosthesis which made him appear to have rotting and broken teeth. Brennan was billed third in Northwest Passage after Spencer Tracy and Robert Young.

Zanuck at Fox announced he wanted to make The Man from Home, once a vehicle for Will Rogers, with Brennan. Instead Brennan was  top-billed in Fox's Maryland (1940), an attempt to repeat the success of Kentucky. Brennan said he had been working constantly since Christmas 1937. "I'm just plain punch drunk", he said.

Third Oscar: The Westerner (1940)
Brennan had one of his best ever roles in Goldwyn's The Westerner (1940), playing the villainous Judge Roy Bean opposite Gary Cooper. William Wyler directed and the film earned Brennan his third Best Supporting Actor Oscar within a five-year span.

Goldwyn bought Trading Post to be a vehicle for Brennan but it was never made.

Instead he supported Deanna Durbin in Nice Girl? (1941), then Cooper again in Frank Capra's Meet John Doe (1941) and Hawks' Sergeant York (1941). Sergeant York, which earned Brennan a fourth Oscar nomination, was an enormous hit. He could also be seen in This Woman is Mine (1941), as a sea captain.

Brennan played the top-billed lead in Swamp Water (1941), the first American film by the director Jean Renoir, a drama also featuring Walter Huston and starring Dana Andrews. He was in Rise and Shine (1941) then played the reporter Sam Blake, who befriended and encouraged Lou Gehrig (played by Cooper) in Pride of the Yankees (1942).

Brennan was in some war films, Stand By for Action (1942) and Hangmen Also Die! (1943), in which he played a Czechoslovak professor. He was in Slightly Dangerous (1943), The Last Will and Testament of Tom Smith (1943, a short), and Goldwyn's Russia-set war epic The North Star (1943).

He was top billed in a follow up to Kentucky and Maryland at Fox, Home in Indiana (1944).

Brennan was particularly skilled in playing the sidekick of the protagonist or the "grumpy old man" in films such as To Have and Have Not (1944), the Hawks-directed Humphrey Bogart film which introduced Lauren Bacall.

Brennan was a comic pirate in the Bob Hope film The Princess and the Pirate (1944). He was teamed with John Wayne for the first time since both men obtained stardom in Dakota (1945), directed by Joseph Kane. He supported Bette Davis in A Stolen Life (1946) and was in a musical at Fox, Centennial Summer (1946), where he played a family paterfamilias.

Westerns roles
Brennan returned to villainy as Old Man Clanton in My Darling Clementine (1946), opposite Henry Fonda for director John Ford.

Brennan followed this with parts in Nobody Lives Forever (1946) at Warners, and a girl-and-dog story at Republic, Driftwood (1947).

He did another Americana film at Fox, Scudda Hoo! Scudda Hay! (1948), then was in one of the best films in his career, Red River (1948), playing John Wayne's sidekick for Howard Hawks.

After supporting Robert Mitchum in Blood on the Moon (1948) he played another kindly father role in The Green Promise (1949). Brennan was billed second to Rod Cameron in Brimstone (1949), directed by Kane, and he supported Gary Cooper in Task Force (1949).

Brennan focused on Westerns: Singing Guns (1950) with Vaughn Monroe, A Ticket to Tomahawk (1950), Curtain Call at Cactus Creek (1950), The Showdown (1950) with Wild Bill Elliot, Surrender (1950), Along the Great Divide (1951), Best of the Badmen (1951), and Return of the Texan (1952).

The Wild Blue Yonder (1951) was a non-Western, a war film. So too was Lure of the Wilderness (1952), a remake of Swamp Water with Brennan reprising his role, though given less screen time on this occasion.

Brennan was in Sea of Lost Ships (1953) with John Derek, Drums Across the River (1954) with Audie Murphy, The Far Country (1954) with James Stewart, and Four Guns to the Border (1954) with Rory Calhoun. He had a good part in Bad Day at Black Rock (1955) at MGM.

Later work

Work on television
Brennan began to work on television, guest starring on episodes of Screen Directors Playhouse, Lux Video Theatre, Schlitz Playhouse, Ethel Barrymore Theater, Cavalcade of America, and The Ford Television Theatre. He played an old outlaw, Joe, in the 1956 episode, "Vengeance Canyon", on Dick Powell's Zane Grey Theatre. In the story line, Joe tries to convince a young  Clint Harding (Ben Cooper), that vengeance is not productive. Sheb Wooley played another outlaw, Brock, this episode.

He appeared as himself as a musical judge in the 1953–1954 ABC series Jukebox Jury. Brennan later said he preferred doing television to movies because there were not "long lay offs between jobs."

He continued to appear in movies such as Gunpoint! (1955) and The Proud Ones (1956) and was in a short about Israel, Man on a Bus (1955).

Brennan was in "Americana" films such as Glory (1956), Come Next Spring (1956) and in Batjac's Good-bye My Lady (1956) with 14-year-old Brandon deWilde with whom he recorded The Stories of Mark Twain that same year. In the latter film he was top billed and directed by William Wellman but the film was not widely seen.

He appeared in The Way to the Gold (1957) and was in a big hit playing Debbie Reynolds's grandfather in the romantic comedy Tammy and the Bachelor (1957).

Brennan was given another lead role in God Is My Partner (1957), a low budget movie that was a surprise hit.

The Real McCoys

Brennan had resisted overtures to star in a regular TV series but relented for The Real McCoys, a sitcom about a poor West Virginia family that relocated to a farm in Southern California. It was a hit and ran from 1957 to 1963.

Brennan continued to appear in films and other TV shows during the series' run such as Colgate Theatre and another Howard Hawks' picture, Rio Bravo (1959), in support to John Wayne and Dean Martin.

After five years on ABC, The Real McCoys switched to CBS for a final season. Brennan joined with the series creator, Irving Pincus, to form Brennan-Westgate Productions. The series was co-produced with Danny Thomas's Marterto Productions. It also featured Richard Crenna, Kathleen Nolan, Lydia Reed, and Michael Winkelman.

For Brennan Productions, Brennan starred in Shoot Out at Big Sag (1962). He appeared as a villainous river pirate up against James Stewart in MGM's epic How the West Was Won (1963).

Singing career
Brennan's success with The Real McCoys led to him making a few recordings, the most popular being "Old Rivers", about an old farmer and his mule, which was released as a single in 1962 by Liberty Records with "The Epic Ride of John H. Glenn" on the flip side. "Old Rivers" peaked at number five in the U.S. Billboard chart, making the 67 year-old Brennan the oldest living person to have a Top 40 hit at the time and in fact, the oldest living person to have a top 5 hit.  At age 68, Brennan reached the Top 40 again, this time with "Mama Sang a Song" on November 17, 1962.

After The Real McCoys ended, Brennan provided the voice for a cartoon of The Shooting of Dan McGrew.

Other TV roles and Disney
Brennan starred as the wealthy executive Walter Andrews in the short-lived 1964–1965 ABC series The Tycoon, with Van Williams.

Brennan had a support part in Those Calloways (1965), his first film for the Disney Organisation, where he was again paired with Brandon deWilde. He had a small role in The Oscar (1966).

In 1967, he starred in another ABC series, The Guns of Will Sonnett (1967–1969), as an older man in search of his gunfighter son, James Sonnett, with his grandson, Jeff, played by Dack Rambo. It ran for two seasons.

Brennan was top billed in Disney's The Gnome-Mobile (1967) and did a pilot for a TV series Horatio Alger Jones that was not picked up.

After a support role in Who's Minding the Mint? (1967), he returned to Disney for The One and Only, Genuine, Original Family Band (1968).

Brennan had a part as the villain in Support Your Local Sheriff! (1969) with James Garner.

Later career
Brennan received top billing over Pat O'Brien in the TV movie The Over-the-Hill Gang (1969) and Fred Astaire in The Over-the-Hill Gang Rides Again (1970).

He joined the second season of the CBS sitcom To Rome with Love (1969–1971), with John Forsythe. This was Brennan's last television series as a member of the permanent cast, although he did make a number of appearances on Alias Smith and Jones.

Around this time he also starred in the TV movies The Young Country (1970), Two for the Money (1972) and Home for the Holidays (1972). He was announced for a Western, One Day in Eden but it does not appear to have been made.

He started filming Herbie Rides Again (1973) for Disney but fell ill and had to be replaced.

Brennan's last screen appearance was in the Western Smoke in the Wind (1975), directed by Joseph Kane.

Personal life
 

In 1920, Brennan married Ruth Caroline Wells. They had three children in their 54-year marriage: Arthur, Walter, and Ruth. Ruth's husband, Dixon McCully Lademan, was a captain in the U.S. Navy in World War II, the Korean War, and the Vietnam War. Brennan's son Arthur Wells "Big Mike" Brennan and his wife, Florence Irene (Whitman) Brennan, lived in Joseph, Oregon. Brennan and his wife were members of the far-right and anti-communist John Birch Society.

In 1940, Brennan purchased the 12,000-acre Lightning Creek Ranch, 20 miles north of Joseph, Oregon. He built the Indian Lodge Motel, a movie theater, and a variety store in Joseph, and continued going there between film roles until his death. Some members of his family continue to live in the area.

Brennan spent his last years mostly in retirement at his ranch in Moorpark in Ventura County, California. He died of emphysema at the age of 80 in Oxnard, California. His remains were interred at San Fernando Mission Cemetery in Los Angeles.

Religious and political views 
Brennan, a Roman Catholic, did not publicize his own religious affiliation, but declared in 1964, "I'm too old not to be a religious fella. [...] It appears we are losing something a lot of people made a lot of sacrifices for." That year Brennan spoke at "Project Prayer", a rally attended by 2,500 at the Shrine Auditorium in Los Angeles. The gathering, hosted by Anthony Eisley, sought to flood Congress with letters in support of mandatory school prayer, following two decisions of the Supreme Court in 1962 and 1963 that had struck down the practice of mandatory prayer in public schools as being in conflict with the Establishment Clause of the First Amendment to the United States Constitution.

According to his biographer Carl Rollyson, Brennan was fiercely opposed to Communism and reportedly branded people as Communists if they supported John F. Kennedy. "He thought that the Watts riots could have been stopped 'with a machine gun'" and expressed satisfaction at the murder of the Rev. Martin Luther King Jr.  Rollyson also reported that Brennan's home "included a bunker stocked with weapons and food in anticipation of a Soviet invasion." It's been said that when he heard of the news that King was assassinated, Brennan danced a jig, much to the shock of the cast and crew of The Guns of Will Sonnett, and did the same for the assassination of Robert F. Kennedy.

A staunch conservative Republican and a member of the Motion Picture Alliance for the Preservation of American Ideals, Brennan supported Barry Goldwater in the 1964 United States presidential election due to his voting against the Civil Rights Act of 1964, but later endorsed George Wallace in 1968 believing Richard Nixon was too liberal for a Republican. In 1972, he endorsed far-right candidate John Schmitz, who much like Brennan, was a member of the John Birch Society. Brennan also endorsed Ronald Reagan in the 1966 California gubernatorial election and in his reelection in 1970.

Legacy 
Film historians and critics have long regarded Brennan as one of the finest character actors in motion picture history. While the roles he was adept at playing were diverse, he is probably best remembered for his portrayals in Western movies, such as Judge Roy Bean in The Westerner, trail hand Nadine Groot in Red River, and Deputy Stumpy in Rio Bravo. He was the first actor to win three Academy Awards and remains the only person to have won Best Supporting Actor three times. However, he remained somewhat embarrassed as to how he won the awards; in the early years of the Academy Awards, extras were given the right to vote. Brennan was popular with the Union of Film Extras, and since their numbers were overwhelming, he won every time he was nominated. His third win led to the disenfranchisement of the union from Oscar voting.  Following this change, Brennan lost his fourth Best Supporting Actor nomination in 1941 for Sergeant York (the award went to Donald Crisp for How Green Was My Valley).

In all, Brennan appeared in more than 230 film and television roles during a career that spanned nearly five decades. For his contributions to the film industry, he has a motion pictures star on the Hollywood Walk of Fame at 6501 Hollywood Boulevard. In 1970, he was inducted into the Western Performers Hall of Fame at the National Cowboy & Western Heritage Museum in Oklahoma City, where his photograph hangs prominently.

Filmography

Film

Television

Radio

Discography
Albums
{| class="wikitable"
|-
! Year
! Album
! style="width:45px;"| US
! Label
|-
| 1960
| Dutchman's Gold
| style="text-align:center;"| —
| Dot
|-
| rowspan="3"| 1962
| Old Rivers
| style="text-align:center;"| 54
| Liberty
|-
| Mama Sang a Song
| style="text-align:center;"| —
| Liberty
|-
| Twas the Night Before Christmas... Back Home''
| style="text-align:center;"| —
| Liberty
|}Singles'''

Awards and nominations

See also
 List of actors with Academy Award nominations

References

(40) https://www.tcm.com/tcmdb/person/21833%7C153238/Walter-Brennan#overview

Further reading

External links

 
 
 Guide to Walter Brennan Papers  at Dickinson Research Centre

1894 births
1974 deaths
20th-century American male actors
20th-century American singers
American country singer-songwriters
American male film actors
American male silent film actors
American male television actors
American people of Irish descent
Best Supporting Actor Academy Award winners
Burials at San Fernando Mission Cemetery
California Republicans
Cambridge Rindge and Latin School alumni
Catholics from California
Catholics from Massachusetts
Catholics from Oregon
Country musicians from California
Deaths from emphysema
Dot Records artists
Liberty Records artists
Male Western (genre) film actors
Male actors from Cambridge, Massachusetts
Male actors from Oxnard, California
People from Malden, Massachusetts
People from Moorpark, California
People from Swampscott, Massachusetts
People from Wallowa County, Oregon
Singer-songwriters from California
United States Army personnel of World War I
United States Army soldiers
Vaudeville performers
American anti-communists
Singer-songwriters from Massachusetts
Singer-songwriters from Oregon
Conservatism in the United States
John Birch Society members
New Right (United States)